Duruwa (Odia: ପରଜି, Devanagari: दुरुवा) or Dhurwa or Parji is a Central Dravidian language spoken by the Duruwa people of India, in the districts of Koraput in Odisha and Bastar in Chhattisgarh. The language is related to Ollari and Kolami, which is also spoken by other neighbouring tribes.

Classification
Duruwa is a member of the Central Dravidian languages. Duruwa is a spoken language and is generally not written. Whenever it is written, it makes use of the Devanagari script in Bastar district and Odia script in Koraput district.

Phonology

Dialects
There are four dialects: Tiriya, Nethanar, Dharba, and Kukanar. They are mutually intelligible.

References

Agglutinative languages
Dravidian languages
Languages of India
Endangered languages of India